Antonio Beduschi (1576– alive 1607) was an Italian painter active in the early-Baroque period, mainly in his hometown of Cremona. He imitated the style of Antonio Campi. His sister, Angela Beduschi, was also a painter. In 1602, he painted the Martyrdom of St. Stephen and a Pietà for the church of San Sepolcro in Piacenza.

References

1576 births
17th-century deaths
16th-century Italian painters
Italian male painters
17th-century Italian painters
Painters from Cremona
Italian Renaissance painters